Oniscoidea is a superfamily of isopod crustaceans, which includes most of the land-living woodlice. It includes the "common woodlouse", Oniscus asellus, in the namesake family Oniscidae.

Families
Fifteen families are recognised in the superfamily :
Bathytropidae Vandel, 1952
Berytoniscidae Vandel, 1973
Detonidae Budde-Lund, 1906
Halophilosciidae Verhoeff, 1908
Olibrinidae Vandel, 1973
Oniscidae Latreille, 1802
Philosciidae Kinahan, 1857
Platyarthridae Vandel, 1946
Pudeoniscidae Lemos de Castro, 1973
Rhyscotidae Budde-Lund, 1908
Scyphacidae Dana, 1852
Speleoniscidae Vandel, 1948
Sphaeroniscidae Vandel, 1964
Stenoniscidae Budde-Lund, 1904
Tendosphaeridae Verhoeff, 1930

References

Woodlice
Arthropod superfamilies